The Makhzumi dynasty also known as Sultanate of Shewa or Shewa Sultanate, was a Muslim kingdom in present-day Ethiopia. Its capital Walale was situated in northern Hararghe in Harla country. Its territory extended possibly to some areas west of the Awash River. The port of Zeila may have influenced the kingdom. The rise of the Makhzumi state at the same time resulted in the decline of the Kingdom of Axum. Several engravings dating back to the 13th century showing the presence of the kingdom are found in Chelenqo, Bate, Harla near Dire Dawa and Munessa near Lake Langano.

The Shewa sultanate was one of the oldest documented Muslim states in the region. The state ran along Muslim trade lines and dominions known to the Arab world as the country of Zeila. Its founding dynastic family, the Makhzumis, is said to have consisted of Arab immigrants who arrived in Showa during the 7th century. This ruling house governed the polity from AH 283/AD 896 to 1285–86, a period of three hundred and ninety years. The Makhzumi dynasty reigned until it was deposed by the Walashma dynasty of Yifat or Ifat (1285-1415). Ifat was once the easternmost district of Shewa Sultanate. In 1285 Ali b. Wali Asma deposed the kings of Shewa and installed a certain MHz. According to historian Mohammed Hassan, one of the main reasons for Shewa's decline was due to conflict with the Kingdom of Damot.

There were nine recorded Sulṭāns of Showa (Shewa), who asserted descent from Wudd ibn Hisham al-Makhzumi. Although Makhzumi rulers names found initially in Harar are Arabic, other texts found elsewhere at a later date use traditional Ethiopian Semitic names alternatively.
 

Shewa Sultanate, established in 896, is the first Muslim state inland and according to the chronicle of the sultanate no major report of conversion to Islam was reported before the beginning of the 12th century. However, beginning with the conversion of the Gbbh people in 1108, whom Trimingham suggested them being the ancestors of Argobba, other people were converted. By mid fourteenth century Islam expanded in the region and the inhabitants leaving north of Awash river were the Muslim people of Zaber and Midra Zega (located south of modern Merhabete); the Argobba (Gabal), the Werji people); Tegulat & Menz people whom at that time were Muslims. The chronicle of Shewa sultanate also mentions that in 1128 the Amhara fled from the land of Werjih people whom at that time were pastoralist people and lived in the Awash valley east of Shoan plateau. According to medieval Islamic manuscripts Makhzumis governed Al-Habash for four centuries.  

Ifat or Yifat, established in early medieval times, was the easternmost district of Shewa Sultanate and was located in the strategic position between the central highlands and the Sea, especially the port of Zeila. In 1285 Ifat's ruler Wali Asma deposed Shewan kings and established the Walasma dynasty and Shewa with its districts including its centers, Walalah and Tegulat, became one of the seven districts of Ifat sultanate. Tegulat, previously the capital of Shewa Sultanate, is situated on a mountain 24 km north of Debre Berhan, located in today's North Shewa Zone (Amhara), and was known by Muslims as mar'ade which later became the seat of emperor Amda Tsion. The chronicle of Amde Sion mentions Khat being widely consumed by Muslims in the city of Marade.

Based on Cerulli's study of the names of the princes J. D. Fage and Roland Oliver were convinced that the inhabitants of Shewa spoke Ethiopian Semitic language likely Argobba language. Argobba are widely believed to be the first to accept Islam collectively, in the Horn of Africa, and lead expansions into various regions under the Sultanate of Shewa. Argobba and Harla seem to have relied on each other in the Islamic period. According to Hararis, the early Emirs of Harar in the Islamic period were Argobba prior to Harari dynasty of rulers. After Shewa was incorporated into Ifat an Egyptian courtier, Al Umari, would describe Ifat Sultanate as one of the largest as well as the richest of Ethiopias Muslim provinces, and Shewa, Adal, Jamma, Lao and Shimi are places incorporated into Ifat.

See also
Sultanate of Harar

References

States and territories established in the 890s
States and territories disestablished in 1285
History of Ethiopia
Ethiopian noble families
Former sultanates in the medieval Horn of Africa
Spread of Islam